Eulychnia is a genus of candelabriform or arborescent cacti, comprising between 6 and 9 species depending on the authority. These desert cacti can survive under very hot conditions—temperatures can reach up to 50 degrees Celsius. Furthermore, this breed of cacti can also survive in some of the driest places in the world such as the Atacama Desert, the driest desert in the world.

Species

This genus has one synonym: Philippicereus Backeb..

Notocacteae
Cactoideae genera